江南 ("south of the river") may refer to:

Places
Jiangnan, a geographic area in China immediately south of the lower reaches of the Yangtze River

Kōnan, Aichi, Japan
Kōnan, Saitama, Japan
Kōnan-ku, Niigata, Niigata, Japan

People

Stations

Other uses

See also
Konan (disambiguation) for homophonous places in Japan